The 18th Central American and Caribbean Junior Championships were held in the Estadio Olímpico Félix Sánchez in Santo Domingo, Dominican Republic, between 2–4 July 2011, and organized by the Federación Dominicana de Asociaciones de Atletismo (FDAA).  The event was open for athletes from the invited countries, that are members of the Central American and Caribbean Athletic Confederation (CACAC), in two categories:  Junior A Category: 17 to 19 years as of 31 December 2010 (Born between 1991 and 1993), and Junior B Category: 14 to 16 years as of 31 December 2010 (Born between 1994 and 1996). By IAAF standards, Junior A is equal to Junior, while Junior B is equal to Youth.

In the Junior A category, a lot of athletes were preparing for the 13th World Junior Championships in Moncton, New Brunswick, Canada on 19–25 July 2010, while in the Junior B category, many athletes were preparing for the inaugural Youth Olympic Games in Singapore August 14–26.

The team from Jamaica dominated the games gaining a total of 63 medals (25 gold, 20 silver, 18 bronze), more than twice as much as the next team, Mexico with 28 medals.  Moreover, Jamaica won the team trophies in all categories leading the corresponding point classifications.

The results are appreciated in detail.

Records

A total of 12 new championship records were set.

Key

Medal summary

The results are published.  Events marked as "Exhibition" did not meet the official conditions with respect to the minimum number of participants ("not less than five (5) competitors of three (3) countries").  In the Male Junior B category, there is no information on the originally scheduled events "5000 m race walk" and "octathlon".

Male Junior A (under 20)

Female Junior A (under 20)

Tiebreaker in High jump

†: Alysbeth Felix from Puerto Rico cleared 1.70m in the first attempt, while Peta-Gaye Reid from Jamaica only in the second attempt.  The medal table was corrected accordingly.

Male Junior B (under 17)

Tiebreaker in Long jump

‡: Javari Fairclough from Jamaica had the second best performance of 7.11m, while the second best jump of Juan Mosquera from Panamá was only 6.97m.  The medal table was corrected accordingly.

Female Junior B (under 17)

Medal table

The combined medal count was published.

Notes:
 Corrected due to tiebreaking procedure.
 Corrected due to tiebreaking procedure.

Team trophies
Team trophies were distributed to the 1st place of the women category, to the 1st place of the men category, and to the 1st place overall (men and women categories).  The results were published.

Overall

Male

Female

Participation

The published team roster
comprise 532 athletes from 27 countries.  Working through the results, an unofficial
count yields the number of about 500 athletes (205 junior, 195 youth)
in the start list.  Following, the numbers in brackets refer to (athletes in published team roster/athletes in start list):

 (6)
 (6/5)
 (59/55)
 (27)
 (16)
 (15)
 (11)
 (14/13)
 (9)
 (75/70)
 (5)
 (8)
 Haïti (5/3)
 (13/12)
 (91/82)
 México (39/36)
 (3)
 (10)
 Panamá (6)
 (31)
 (11/9)
 (4/3)
 (5)
 (52/49)
 (3)
 (3)
 (5)

References

External links
Official CACAC Website
CACAC Championships Website
FDAA Championships Website (partly in Spanish)
World Junior Athletics History

2010
2010 in athletics (track and field)
2010 in Dominican Republic sport
2010 in Central American sport
2010 in Caribbean sport
International athletics competitions hosted by the Dominican Republic
2010 in youth sport